Bo-young is a Korean female given name.

People with this name include:
Lee Bo-young (born 1979), South Korean actress
Park Bo-young (born 1990), South Korean actress

See also
List of Korean given names

Korean feminine given names